Umbuzeiro is a municipality in the state of Paraíba in the Northeast Region of Brazil.

Notable people 
 Epitácio Pessoa, jurist, politician and 11th President of Brazil

See also
List of municipalities in Paraíba

References

Municipalities in Paraíba